Lenísio Teixeira Júnior (born 23 October 1976), commonly known as Lenísio, is a former Brazilian futsal player.

Honours
1 FIFA World Cup (2008)
1 runner FIFA World Cup (2000)
2 Brazilian champion (1999 and 2002)
1 Spanish cup (2003)
3 Brazilian league best player (2000, 2001 and 2002)
3 LNFS best player (2002/03, 2003/04 and 2004/05)
4 Brazilian league top scorer (1997, 2000, 2001 and 2002)
2 LNFS top scorer (2003/04 and 2004/05)
3 LNFS best pivot (2002/03, 2003/04 and 2004/05)

References

External links
futsal.com.br
fifa.com
Futsalplanet

1976 births
Living people
People from Cuiabá
Brazilian men's futsal players
ElPozo Murcia FS players
FS Cartagena players
Sportspeople from Mato Grosso
Pan American Games gold medalists for Brazil
Futsal players at the 2007 Pan American Games
Pan American Games medalists in futsal
Medalists at the 2007 Pan American Games